Week-End Marriage is a 1932 American pre-Code comedy film directed by Thornton Freeland and starring Loretta Young. It was produced by First National Pictures and distributed by Warner Bros. It is based on the 1932 novel, Week-End Marriage, by Faith Baldwin. The film is preserved at the Library of Congress.

Cast

Loretta Young as Lola Davis Hayes
Norman Foster as Ken Hayes
Aline MacMahon as Agnes Davis
George Brent as Peter Acton
Grant Mitchell as Doctor
Vivienne Osborne as Shirley
Sheila Terry as Connie
J. Farrell MacDonald as Mr. Davis
Louise Carter as Mrs. Davis
Roscoe Karns as Jim Davis

Uncredited:
Luis Alberni as Louis The Bootlegger
Irving Bacon as Grocery clerk
Herman Bing as Mr. Mengel
Bill Elliott as Birthday party guest

Box office
According to Warner Bros the film earned $219,000 domestically and $48,000 foreign.

References

External links

1932 films
Films based on American novels
First National Pictures films
Films directed by Thornton Freeland
American black-and-white films
American comedy films
1932 comedy films
Films based on works by Faith Baldwin
1930s American films